Antoni Serra Serra (1708–1755) was a religious writer member of Order of Minims.

Serra was born in Sa Pobla.  He was in the Convent of Saint Francis of Pauoa of Palma and was a Reader of philosophy and theology, Visitor, Mallorca's Order of Minims General and Provincial Vicar Inquisition Qualifier; Postulator in 1739 of the cause of beatification of Catherine Thomas.  He died in Palma, Majorca, aged about 47.

Works 
 De vita moribus et miraculis Catharine Thomas expositio. Ms.
 Mística centella de la caridad ideada en el amoroso incendio con que en aras de la caridad ardia siempre el corazón abrasado del gran Padre y Patriarca San Pedro Nolasco... 1731
 Mística carroça de Ezequiel noble sabia universidad. Solemne novenario... 1737.

Bibliography
 Sa Marjal, Vol. IV, Tom VII, ed. facsímil, 1990, Ajuntament de sa Pobla

1708 births
1755 deaths
People from Sa Pobla
18th-century Spanish Roman Catholic theologians
Spanish male writers
18th-century Latin-language writers
18th-century male writers